Enoyl coenzyme A hydrase (D) may refer to:
 3-hydroxybutyryl-CoA dehydratase, an enzyme
 Enoyl-CoA hydratase, an enzyme